The Pakistan Aeronautical Complex, or PAC) is a major defense contractor and an aerospace manufacturer that is headquartered in Kamra, Punjab, Pakistan. 

The Pakistan Aeronautical Complex is one of the largest defense contractor in aerospace, military support, and national security provider to the Pakistan military.

Founded in 1971 by the Pakistan Air Force (PAF), the PAC designs, develops, and builds aircraft and avionics systems for the Pakistani military— it also provides its services for civilian aircraft. In addition, the PAC performs local maintenance and works on the aircraft MLU systems of foreign-built military and civilian aircraft. It is solely owned by the Pakistan Air Force and its corporate interests and its corporate appointments are directly made by the Chief of Air Staff from the Air HQ.

Many of these products are specially suited for the Pakistan Armed Forces needs, while others are also marketed to foreign export. While it collaborated with several countries’ corporate organizations, the PAC often jointly works with the Turkish TAI and the Chinese CATIC. The PAC has larger commercial and business interests in Myanmar, Nigeria, Qatar, Saudi Arabia and the United Arab Emirates.

History 
In 1971, five years after induction of F-6 aircraft in PAF, it was realized that the aircraft had started falling due for overhaul and, in the absence of an in country overhaul facility, the aircraft would be sent abroad for desired inspections, resulting in huge amounts of spending in terms of foreign exchange and generating undesired downtime for the aircraft fleet. With this background, the commanders of the Pakistan Air Force decided to goal of create an indigenous overhauling facility for the F6 fleet of the PAF. After negotiation with the OEM and the Chinese Government, the establishment of an F6 rebuild factory now known as Aircraft Rebuild Factory (ARF) started at Kamra supervised by Chinese experts. On its completion, the first ever aircraft rolled out after overhaul in the year 1980.

Having gained the overhauling experience of Chinese origin aircraft, it was considered essential to establish a similar GOH facility for French origin Mirage III & V aircraft of the PAF. The project for establishment of Mirage Rebuild Factory (MRF) started in 1974, and the first overhauled Mirage aircraft rolled out of the factory in 1980. Atar 09c engine and related accessories, MRO facility was also established at MRF during the early 1980s with the subsequent addition of various other engine MRO services. After establishment of the overhaul of Chinese and French origin aircraft, efforts were generated to enter into the arena of aircraft manufacturing. As a humble beginning, a single engine turbo prop trainer MFI-17 aircraft was chosen for indigenous manufacturing. After successful negotiation with the Swedish OEM around 1975, another factory was established.

As all these factories are co-located at Kamra, they were placed under the umbrella of Pakistan Aeronautical Complex (PAC). The journey in the aviation industry did not stop here because it was felt that the eyes and ears of these platforms (Ground Based Radar) are not being looked after indigenously and are still creating blind pockets because of prolonged downtimes owing to major maintenance abroad. To cater for this adverse situation, once again an indigenous facility had to be established, so it was decided to establish Kamra Avionics and Radar Factory (KARF), now known as Avionics Production Factory (APF). once again under the umbrella of Pakistan Aeronautical Complex (PAC).

Later, once the influence of avionics systems increased tremendously on capability and performance of the aircraft, a complete setup for the avionics maintenance was embedded into APF. The expertise developed during overhauling of ground radars came in handy at APF, and today it stands out as the most advanced avionics facility in the country.

Similarly, the experience of manufacturing a light aircraft gave Aircraft Manufacturing Factory (AMF) the impetus to go into a co-designing and development program for manufacturing of a jet aircraft. Once again, the Pak-China friendship played a vital role and the K-8 project was initiated at AMF. The project culminated in production of a jet trainer co-designed and produced by Pakistan and China in 1994. AMF is involved even today in manufacturing of about 20% of the structure of K-8 at these facilities. This background of AMF was considered good enough to venture into the area of indigenous production of a jet fighter aircraft. That is how AMF is now fully involved in the notional program of co-producing JF-17 Thunder aircraft with China.

Operations

Since 1947, the Pakistan Air Force operated largely dependent on foreign suppliers, fighter jets and aircraft had to be sent abroad for desired inspection, development, and to produce parts to maintain the fighter aircraft in service, causing the downsizing of the air force.

After consultation from the PAF's commanders at AHQ at the Rawalpindi Cantonment, the Pakistan Aeronautical Complex (PAC) was established in 1973 in Kamra with Aircraft Rebuild Factory first being functional. PAC was established by the Pakistan Air Force (PAF) as part of the new defence policy introduced in 1972; the PAC represents wide range of corporate revenue of the air force while fulfilling the national security needs of the country. The Pakistan Aeronautical Complex started with three main Ministry of Defence projects designated P-721, P-741 and P-751. The first two digits show the year of project approval and launch, the third digit is a serial designator.

Since 1980s–90s, PAC functions include licensed-built Mirage III, Mirage 5, and the F-16s as well as building the F100 engines for the F-16s under license from Pratt & Whitney.

Aircraft Rebuild Factory

Aircraft Rebuild Factory (ARF), formerly known as F-6 Rebuild Factory (F-6RF) and P-721, is primarily dedicated to the overhaul and parts manufacture of Chinese aircraft in service with the Pakistan Air force (PAF). The factory is capable of overhauling and parts manufacturing for the Shenyang F-6 (now retired by the PAF), Nanchang A-5 (also retired by the PAF) and F-7 combat aircraft, as well as the Shenyang FT-5 and FT-6 jet trainer aircraft. ARF is also capable of manufacturing drop tanks and harnesses of aircraft.

Mirage Rebuild Factory
The Mirage Rebuild Factory (MRF), formerly known as P-741, is dedicated to the overhaul of French origin military aircraft in service with the Pakistan Air Force (PAF), the Dassault Mirage III and Mirage V combat aircraft. Overhaul and manufacturing services were used by other countries with French Mirage aircraft in service. The Mirage III and Mirage 5 are under license and built at the PAC factory. This factory also grew to service and overhaul the Pratt & Whitney F100 turbofan engines belonging to the F-16 Fighting Falcon combat aircraft of the PAF. Due to lack of budget for replacing outdated aircraft, the MRF was devoted to domestically overhauling them, which according to claims, saved the country billions of dollars.

Project ROSE
Project ROSE ("Retrofit Of Strike Element") was a program initiated by the Pakistan Air Force (PAF) Pakistan Aeronautical Complex for the upgrades of the military avionics and electronics system of its aging Dassault Aviation– built Mirage fighter jets. The program focused on modernization of military avionics and on-board computer system of Mirage IIIE and the Mirage V supplied by Pakistani Margella Electronics, French SAGEM and the Italian SELEX consortiums, as part of the program.

Conceived in 1992 by the Pakistan Air Force, the program started in 1995 on main considerations of retiring the A–5 Fantan from active service. The Pakistan Air Force, which already was operating Dassalt Mirage IIIs and Dassalt Mirage 5s, began its procurement of second-hand Mirage fighters from Australia, Lebanon, Libya, and Spain at the price range within the MoD's fund. Over 90% of the aircraft were retrofitted at the Aeronautical Complex in Kamra; few were upgraded in France. From 1996–2000, several Mirage IIIE and Mirage 5 were bought from the other countries and were upgraded under this program at the Pakistan Aeronautical Complex. In this project the avionics of the aircraft were increased and in-flight refueling was added. Due to this, the range and combat radius of the fighter jet was increased, new grifo fire control radars having about 75 km range were introduced which gave the aircraft capability to fire BVR missiles if needed, the metallurgy of aircraft was overhauled and service life was increased. The capability to do take offs and landings from motorways was also added, after the Rose-3 upgrading the locally manufactured standoff weapons like H-4 SOW bombs, H-2 SOW bombs, Takbir glide bomb , Stealth nuclear cruise missiles such as Ra'ad MK-1 and Ra'ad Mk-2 were added in the weapon package of the aircraft. Further considerations for upgrades were recommended but the program was terminated due to increasingly combined costs of the spare parts and the conditions of the second–hand airframes of the Mirage IIIE and Mirage V at the time of their procurement from various countries.

It is currently expected that all of the ROSE-upgraded Mirage fighters jets will remain in combat service with the Pakistan Air Force beyond 2020 in specialized Tactical Attack roles. They are expected to be replaced by JF–17 Thunder (Block-3, Block-4 and Block-5) or additional F-16s or 5th generation stealth fighters Project Azm.

Aircraft Manufacturing Factory

Aircraft Manufacturing Factory (AMF), formerly known as P-751, is dedicated to heavy military aircraft manufacturing. The MFI-17 Mushshak basic trainer aircraft built under license for use by the Pakistan Air Force (PAF) and Pakistan Army aviation wing. This factory project managed the aircraft modification and development venture that resulted in the MFI-395 Super Mushshak basic trainer, based on the MFI-17 Mushshak. Development of the K-8 Karakorum (also known as Hongdu JL-8) intermediate/advanced jet trainer was done in co-operation with Hongdu Aviation Industry Group of China, with AMF manufacturing parts for the aircraft. The JF-17 multi-role combat aircraft (also known as FC-1), a joint project between China and Pakistan, is now being manufactured by AMF. The MFI-17, MFI-395, K-8 and JF-17 are now in service with the (PAF). AMF also designs and manufactures unmanned aerial vehicles for uses such as target practice.

Manufacture of sub-assemblies for the JF-17 light-weight multi-role fighter began on 22 January 2008, while serial production of the fighter began on 30 June 2009.

On 20 August 2009 the PAF announced that it would begin production of its own unmanned aerial vehicles in collaboration with Italian company Selex Galileo. Production of the UAV, named Falco, was to begin soon. An earlier opportunity to manufacture a fighter aircraft was lost when the Pakistan Air Force abandoned Project Sabre II in 1987, a joint effort by Pakistan, China and Grumman Aerospace that would have seen AMF manufacturing a re-designed Chengdu F-7 variant.

Avionics Production Factory
Avionics production Factory (APF), formerly known as Kamra Avionics and Radar Factory (KARF) was initiated as Radar Maintenance Centre (RMC) in 1983 to overhaul and rebuild ground-based radar systems. In 1989, RMC was expanded to become Kamra Radar & Avionics Factory (KARF).  APF has the facilities to assemble and overhaul airborne as well as ground-based radar systems, electronics and avionics.  the  ISO 9002 certified facility among PAC, the factory was involved in upgrading the Pakistan Air Force (PAF) Chengdu F-7P interceptor fleet by replacing the original Italian built FIAR Grifo radar-7 radar with the more capable FIAR Grifo-7 mk-II radar, which was assembled under licence by APF. More recently, radar production involved the license assembly of the latest upgrade variant of the FIAR Grifo-7, the Grifo-7MG radar, which arms the Chengdu F-7PG combat aircraft of the PAF. In mid-2009 it was reported that APF personnel had completed training on printed circuit board assembly machines supplied by US company APS Novastar, which would be used to make circuit boards for combat aircraft avionics.

As PAC's capabilities become competitive in the region, commercial ventures from national and international companies are also being undertaken.

Project Azm 

Project Azm was a cancelled program for development of fifth-generation fighter aircraft within Pakistan. Pakistan will join the Turkish Aerospace Industries (TUSAŞ) led Turkish Fighter Experimental (TF-X)/National Combat Aircraft (MMU) project as minor partner with Turkey's TUSAŞ leading the program.

Visions

Exploration for 5th Generation 

In March of 2022, then Interior Minister of Pakistan Sheikh Rasheed said on a TV show that Pakistan is in talks with China  to acquire the Chinese version of 5th Generation Air Superiority Fighter stealth aircraft Chengdu J-20 .
In recent months, many delgations from Pakistan Air Force and Pakistan Aeronautical Complex have visted China in this regard. Deals for Chengdu J-20  are possibly to be signed in 2023.

In September of 2022, Indian TV channels claimed that Pakistan have sent 15 pilots in China for training to fly Chengdu J-20.

Products

Fighter aircraft
 JF-17 Thunder — Multirole jet fighter — Co-production with Chengdu Aerospace Corporation of China.

Trainer aircraft
 Karakorum-8 — Intermediate jet trainer & light attack aircraft — Co-production with Hongdu Aviation Industry Group of China.
 MFI-17 Mushshak  — Turboprop aircraft for basic training — Upgraded variant of MFI-15 Safari.
 Super Mushshak —  Two/three-seat, piston engine, turboprop aircraft for basic training, liaison & light ground attack — Upgraded variant of MFI-17 Mushshak.

Unmanned Aerial Vehicles (UAVs)

 Galileo Falco — Surveillance UAV — Production began in August 2009 under license of Selex ES of Italy.
 Baaz — Aerial Drone — A recoverable aerial target designed for use with air defence guns and surface-to-air missile (SAM) systems. It has a very high rate of accuracy.
 Ababeel — Aerial Drone — A small arms target designed for target practice use by operators of small arms, machine guns. Also used to train operators for the larger and faster Baaz Aerial Drone. Can be very effective for recce missions.

Consumer Electronics
 PAC-PAD 1
 PAC-PAD Takhti 7
 The PAC e-book 1
 The PAC n-book 1

Retired
 Chengdu J-7 — Interceptor jet fighter — Manufacturing, Overhaul and Repair of aircraft as F-7PG — from Chengdu Aircraft Industry Group of China. 
 MFI-15 Safari — Trainer aircraft — Licensed copy of Saab Safari of Sweden.
 Shenyang J-6 — Fighter aircraft — Imported and overhauled as F-6 from Shenyang Aircraft Corporation of China.

Services

 Aircraft manufacturing
 Aircraft overhauling & maintenance
 Avionics
 Electronics, radars & sensors
 Engine overhauling & maintenance
 Materials
 Systems & accessories

See also 
• PAF Base Minhas

• Kamra, Pakistan

References

External links
 
 GlobalSecurity.org PAC factsheet

 
Attock District
Manufacturing plants in Pakistan
Defence companies of Pakistan
Aircraft manufacturers of Pakistan
Aerospace companies of Pakistan
Industrial parks in Pakistan
Military research of Pakistan
Engineering units and formations of Pakistan
Pakistan federal departments and agencies
1971 establishments in Pakistan
Government-owned companies of Pakistan